Michelle Ivory Cooper (born December 4, 2002) is an American soccer player who plays as a forward.

Career
Cooper won the Hermann Trophy as the best female soccer player in 2022 while playing for Duke. While playing for the USWNT under 20 team, she won the Golden Boot and Golden Ball awards and made the Best XI team at the  2022 CONCACAF Women's U-20 Championship. She was drafted second overall in the 2023 NWSL Draft by the Kansas City Current.

Honors and awards

International

United States U20

CONCACAF Women's U-20 Championship: 2022

Individual
CONCACAF Women's U-20 Championship Golden Boot: 2022
CONCACAF Women's U-20 Championship Golden Ball: 2022
Hermann Trophy: 2022

References

Living people
American women's soccer players
United States women's under-20 international soccer players
2002 births
Duke Blue Devils women's soccer players
Kansas City Current draft picks
Women's association football forwards